Emanuel Christopher Welch (born February 6, 1971), known as Chris Welch, is a lawyer and politician who is the Speaker of the Illinois House of Representatives. A Democrat, he represents the 7th district, which includes all or parts of River Forest, Forest Park, Maywood, Broadview, Bellwood, Hillside, Westchester, La Grange Park and Berkeley.

Welch was elected the 70th Speaker of the Illinois House on January 13, 2021, succeeding longtime Speaker Michael Madigan. He is the first Black Illinois House speaker.

Education and law career
Welch graduated from Proviso West High School in Hillside, Illinois, in 1989. He attended Northwestern University, graduating with a B.A. degree in 1993, and the John Marshall Law School, graduating with a J.D. degree in 1997.

A member of the Illinois bar in private practice, Welch is a partner at Ancel Glink. Before Ancel Glink, he was a partner at Sanchez, Daniels and Hoffman, LLP.

Proviso Township High School Board of Education 
In 2001, Welch was elected to the Proviso Township High School District 209 Board of Education, and later served at the Board's president. He stepped down from the Board in 2013, upon his election to the House.

In 2008, the Proviso School Board's former law firm, Odelson & Sterk, which it fired in 2007, sued Welch for allegedly making defamatory comments about the firm on the blog "Proviso Insider", to which Welch was an anonymous contributor. The district covered his legal expenses, but questions were raised about whether the firm was targeting Welch for actions taken in his personal capacity, with Board member Theresa Kelly filing a complaint with the regional superintendent of schools about the matter. In 2011, Welch sought to have the district pay a $400,000 settlement he reached with the firm, but the District's Financial Oversight Panel blocked this. In July 2012, Welch agreed to pay the firm an unknown amount.

Misconduct allegations 
In March 2012, when Welch was running for state representative, a Chicago Sun-Times report detailed instances of alleged nepotism and misconduct Welch allegedly engaged in on the Board. Per the report, the District fired two women when their personal relationships with Welch ended, including a woman who claimed she was fired from her post as an assistant to the superintendent after breaking up with him. The woman filed a lawsuit about the matter, which was eventually settled.

The other woman, Beyonca Johnson, said Welch sexually harassed her after their breakup and told her "she could kiss her job goodbye." She filed a restraining order and a federal lawsuit against Welch, both of which were later dismissed. She went on to run against Welch in the 2012 Democratic primary for the state House seat Welch won, losing to Welch.

The district hired both Welch's brother and the best man at his wedding during Welch's tenure. In total, he allegedly hired 19 close friends and relatives to positions in the district.

While running for state representative in 2006, Welch was criticized for several campaign donations he received from district contractors he helped hire.

Illinois House of Representatives

Elections 
Welch first ran for the Illinois House of Representatives in district 7 in 2006, challenging incumbent Democrat Karen Yarbrough. Welch focused his campaign on education and criticized Yarbrough over the issue. He lost the primary to Yarbrough.

In 2012, Welch again sought the Democratic nomination for the legislative seat, and he narrowly defeated three other candidates including his former girlfriend in the primary and ran unopposed in the general election. He was sworn in on January 9, 2013.

Welch's 2014 Democratic primary challenger, Antoinette Gray, was removed from the ballot for failing to meet the residency requirements for the position, leaving Welch unopposed in the primary. He also ran unopposed in that year's general election for the seat.

In 2016, Welch sought a third term in the House, defeated Democratic primary challenger Chris Harris, and was unopposed in the general election. He was reelected in 2018 and 2020 without a challenger.

Welch was reelected in 2022 against Republican challenger Eddie Kornegay with 77% of the vote.

Tenure 
In 2018, then Governor-elect J.B. Pritzker appointed Welch to the Educational Success transition committee, which is responsible for state education policy.

Welch led a special House committee investigating the ComEd Bribery scandal, which then-House Speaker Michael Madigan, of whom Welch was a top ally, was later charged in. The committee's work ended abruptly without any findings. Welch later said that he felt the matter needed to be handled by prosecutors.

Welch also chaired the House Executive Committee. In the 2020 U.S. presidential election, he served as a presidential elector on behalf of Joe Biden, replacing former U.S. Representative Jerry Costello.

House speaker

Election 
In 2021, after 19 House Democrats publicly said they would not vote to reelect incumbent Michael Madigan as House speaker, Madigan put his bid for the speakership on hold, betting that the Democratic caucus could not find another candidate. Welch ran for speaker at Madigan's urging. During his campaign for speaker, questions were raised about his past misconduct and treatment of women and his close ties to Madigan, but Welch won the support of the Black and Democratic Latino caucuses.

On January 13, 2021, the Illinois House of Representatives elected Welch speaker. He is the first African American to serve as Speaker of the Illinois House and is the first person other than Madigan to lead the Illinois House Democratic caucus since 1983.

First term (2021-2023) 
In Welch's first term as House Speaker, the General Assembly passed an assault weapons ban, the Clean Energy Jobs Act, the Safe-T Act, and new district maps to reflect the 2020 census data. 

In the 2022 elections, Democrats expanded their supermajority in the House to 78 seats. Welch said that the Supreme Court's decision in Dobbs eliminating nationwide protection for abortion was a major factor in House Democrats' electoral success, and denied gerrymandering played a role.

According to the Chicago Tribune, Welch has "received mostly good reviews" from his caucus as speaker for "diversity in assigning tasks to and bringing in more people in bill negotiations."

Second term (2023-) 
The House reelected Welch speaker on January 11, 2023.

Two days later, he announced Robyn Gable would be Majority Leader, replacing Greg Harris, who retired.

Personal life 
Welch grew up with two brothers and three cousins, the children of his aunt who was murdered in Chicago. He has said that during his childhood, his mother worked as a nurse and his father was a union factory worker who worked two jobs a day.

Welch is married to attorney ShawnTe Raines-Welch and has two children. In 2022, Raines-Welch won the Democratic nomination to be a Cook County judge. Her campaign raised around $666,000, an unusually large amount of money for such a race.

A 2002 police report indicated that officers were called to Welch’s home, where an ex-girlfriend told them that Welch slammed her head into a kitchen countertop numerous times after she called him "a loser." Welch was taken into custody, but the woman did not press charges after talking it over with a relative of Welch’s, according to the report.

Welch lives in Hillside, Illinois.

Electoral history

References

External links 
Representative Emanuel Chris Welch (D) 7th District at the Illinois General Assembly
By session: 101st, 100th, 99th, 98th
Official Constituent Services Website
 

Living people
1971 births
21st-century African-American politicians
21st-century American politicians
African-American state legislators in Illinois
Illinois lawyers
John Marshall Law School (Chicago) alumni
2020 United States presidential electors
Northwestern University alumni
People from Westchester, Illinois
School board members in Illinois
Speakers of the Illinois House of Representatives
Democratic Party members of the Illinois House of Representatives